The 2016 Catalunya GP2 Series round was a GP2 Series motor race on 14 and 15 May 2016 at the Circuit de Catalunya in Spain. It was the first round of the 2016 GP2 Series. The race weekend supported the 2016 Spanish Grand Prix.

Background
The defending champions for GP2, Stoffel Vandoorne, were unable to defend their respective titles due to the ruling which forbids driver champions from returning to the series. Vandoorne remained as a McLaren reserve and test driver, where he stood in for the injured Fernando Alonso at the Bahrain Grand Prix, while also racing in the Super Formula series in Japan.

Classification

Qualifying 
A dramatic qualifying session saw Pierre Gasly took his first pole position of the season, his third in a row dating back to last season, and the fourth in his GP2 career. It was also the first pole position for Prema Racing, which they scored on their debut in the GP2 Series. Norman Nato grabbed his best-ever qualifying position in GP2 with a strong second place, with Alex Lynn behind in third.

1. – Matsushita received a three-place grid penalty for impeding a rival during the qualifying session.
2. – Gelael received a three-place grid penalty for impeding a rival during the qualifying session. However, since he was unable to serve his penalty in full, Gelael started from the pitlane.

Feature Race 
Pierre Gasly got a good getaway from pole position, followed by Nato and the fast-starting ART car of Sergey Sirotkin. However, the safety car was called out when rookie Luca Ghiotto crashed at Turn 3. The restart on Lap 5 saw no positional changes up front. Soft-shod Alex Lynn and Jordan King started the pit stop cycle, but Gasly's blistering pace out front eradicated any potential strategic advantage. The battle for second raged on, with Nato holding off a charging Sirotkin. But Sirotkin's race quickly unravelled when he spun in Turn 2 on Lap 23 and stalled the engine, a rare mistake from the Russian driver. The safety car came out once again while Sirotkin's stricken car was retrieved. This proved advantageous for the drivers on the hard tyre, as they were awarded a "free" pit stop under the safety car. As such, Gasly, Nato, Nicholas Latifi, and Sergio Canamasas all emerged in front of Lynn.

The race restarted again on Lap 26, and this time, there were moves aplenty. Artem Markelov jumped ahead of both Lynn and King for P5, before Nato made a brave race-winning move in the final complex of corners to take the lead. Shortly after, the race became time-certain, which spurred on drivers to make more moves. Latifi passed Gasly on Lap 33 to claim second, while Markelov continued his charge to the front by deposing Canamasas for fourth. 

The race ended under a bizarre set of circumstances: Prema Racing's Antonio Giovinazzi clattered into the back of Raffaele Marciello on Lap 34, sending him into the Turn 4 gravel. The safety car came out for the third time, with time running out just before the field crossed the line. Under GP2 rules, there is always one lap after the time runs out, but despite this rule, the checkered flag was accidentally waved one lap too early. Because of race control's gaffe, the results were rolled back to one lap before, which annulled the accident between Marciello and Giovinazzi. However, Giovinazzi was still awarded a twenty-second time penalty which relegated him to an 18th-place finish.

Sprint Race
Reverse-grid polesitter Raffaele Marciello got a clean start, holding off Jordan King into the first corner, but Alex Lynn got a great start from third and passed King into turn 2. It took Lynn merely two laps to catch and sail past Marciello, setting the Briton up for a dominant drive to victory. Behind him, Marciello plummeted to fourth, being passed by King and Pierre Gasly in quick succession. Gasly then overtook King for second on Lap 6 and set off in pursuit of his former teammate. Positions remained at the front of the field, but it was all change in the middle of the pack. Sergey Sirotkin and Luca Ghiotto chewed through almost half the field from their last-row starting positions. 

The intense midfield battle came to an abrupt end on Lap 21, when Sean Gelael aggressively blocked Antonio Giovinazzi on the back straight, but Giovinazzi was already partially alongside the Indonesian driver. He was launched over Gelael's left-rear wheel and slid down the remainder of the straight, collecting an innocent Arthur Pic in Turn 10. Giovinazzi hurtled towards the barriers at unabated speed, skipping across the gravel before slamming the tyre wall side-on. He climbed out of his car visibly shaken, but otherwise uninjured, which was positive news after such a violent impact. The safety car was deployed, but a lengthy clean-up meant that it could only be recalled on the final lap. As a result, Lynn was able to take a second consecutive Spanish sprint race victory, while Gasly, King, Artem Markelov, Marciello, Oliver Rowland, Nicholas Latifi, and Nobuharu Matsushita also claimed points.

Standings after the round

Drivers' Championship standings

Teams' Championship standings

 Note: Only the top five positions are included for both sets of standings.

See also 
 2016 Spanish Grand Prix
 2016 Catalunya GP3 Series round

References

External links 
 Official website of GP2 Series

GP2
Catalunya
Catalunya